Changzhou Changjiang Bus was a bus manufacturer based in Changzhou, Jiangsu, China.  Changzhou Changjiang was reported to be the largest bus builder in China.  Buses are manufactured under the Changjiang brand.

It was reported in 2007 that Liaoning Shuguang Automotive Group has taken over Changzhou Changjiang Bus and merge the bus operations with Huanghai Bus.

China Flxible Bus

In 1994, Flxible's parent company, General Automotive Corporation, and three other American companies, Penske Corporation, Mark IV Industries, and Carrier Corporation, entered into a joint venture with Changzhou Changjiang Bus, a Chinese manufacturer located in Changzhou, Jiangsu, to produce buses based on the Flxible Metro design and with the Flxible name. These buses, which include both front- and rear-engine designs, and share only their general exterior appearance with the American-built Flxibles, were sold to many transit operators in major Chinese cities, including Beijing and Shanghai. A trolleybus version was manufactured for just one operator, the Hangzhou trolleybus system, which bought a total of 77 between the late 1990s and 2001. However, for these vehicles, Changzhou Changjiang supplied the chassis and Metro-style bodies to the Hangzhou Changjiang Bus Company (in Hangzhou), and that company equipped them as trolleybuses.

Changzhou Iveco joint venture
Changzhou Changjiang and Iveco of Italy set up a 50:50 joint venture in 2001 called Changzhou Iveco Bus Co.  The company produced various types of city buses, bus chassis and parts.  The joint venture was dissolved in 2007 when Iveco sold its share for just $1 US to Changjiang.  The j.v. could manufacturer 6,000 to 7,000 buses per year.

Models

References

External links

Bus manufacturers of China
Vehicle manufacturing companies established in 2001
Vehicle manufacturing companies disestablished in 2007
Iveco
Chinese companies disestablished in 2007
Chinese companies established in 2001